Evren Özyiğit (born 1 January 1986) is a Turkish footballer who plays as a goalkeeper for Halide Edip Adıvarspor. He made his Süper Lig debut on 3 May 2008.

References

External links
 
 

1986 births
Living people
People from Aydın
Turkish footballers
Turkey under-21 international footballers
Muğlaspor footballers
Ankaraspor footballers
Eyüpspor footballers
Denizlispor footballers
Akhisarspor footballers
Süper Lig players
Association football goalkeepers